Camp Redwood was established in 1862 as a midway point between the communities of Trinidad and Elk Camp in Humboldt County as a result of the bitter conflict between settlers and Native Americans in the Bald Hills War.  Army regulars were posted at Camp Redwood to act as escorts for both supplies and travelers on what was then the Coastal Trail between the two towns.

References

California in the American Civil War
Closed installations of the United States Army
Forts in California
History of California
History of Humboldt County, California
American Civil War army posts
Bald Hills War
1862 establishments in California